The pepa is a hornpipe musical instrument that is used in traditional music in Assam, India. In Boro language, it is known as Phenpha. It is usually made with the horn of a buffalo.

Significance
"Pepa" is a hornpipe which has been used during Bihu celebrations since ancient times.  Instruments similar to Pepa are also found among other Bodo-Kachari groups like Garo, Tripuri, Dimasa, etc. The Tibetans, Khmers (Austroasiatic) and ancient Chinese also used similar instruments named Rwa-dun and Sneng for religious rituals. Later, it was used as a musical instrument for festive occasions like Bihu. An improved version of Pepa was also developed in the Chutia kingdom which was known as Kaali (made of copper) as mentioned in Deodhai Buranji (where Ahom king Suhungmung brought in Kaali instruments from Sadiya to Sibsagar). 

As the buffalo population is dwindling gradually in Assam due to shrinking pastoral lands, getting a pepa is currently very difficult. Cost of a pepa in market has even reached ₹2500 in recent years.

References

See also
Culture of Assam
Sneng

Woodwind instruments
Musical instruments of Assam
Hornpipes
Indian musical instruments
Water buffalo